is the sixth studio album by Japanese singer-songwriter Miyuki Nakajima, released in November 1979.

Okaerinasai peaked at number two on the Japanese Oricon LP chart, and became one of her most commercially successful albums, selling over 530,000 copies.

Background 
The album contains self-cover versions of the songs Nakajima composed for other artists, including five top-40 hit singles—"Abayo" sung by Naoko Ken (topped the chart in 1976), "Shiawase Shibai" and "Oikakete Yokohama" recorded by Junko Sakurada (reached #3 and #11 on the chart from in 1977-78, respectively), "If I Could Take to the Sky" performed by Tokiko Kato (peaked at #14 in 1978), and "Ame..." by Rumiko Koyanagi (reached #25 in 1978). It also features the song "Rouge" which was initially issued as the title track on Naomi Chiaki's 1977 album of the same name. It was later widely recognized around the Asian countries, because of the cover version interpreted by Faye Wong on her album Coming Home in 1992.

Track listing
All songs composed by Miyuki Nakajima, except the lyrics of "Yomaigoto" written by Yu Aku

Side one

Side two

Personnel
Miyuki Nakajima - Lead vocal, acoustic guitar
Toshiaki Usui - Acoustic guitar
Hiromi Yasuda - Acoustic guitar
Nobuo Tsunetomi - Acoustic guitar
Yasushi Suehara - Acoustic guitar
Chūei Yoshikawa - Acoustic guitar
Shigeru Suzuki - Electric guitar
Kimio Mizutani - Electric guitar
Munemitsu Noguchi - Steel guitar
Tsugotoshi Gotō - Electric bass
Rei Ohara - Electric bass
Shigehiro Takahashi - Electric bass
Shigeaki Takebe - Electric bass
Kazumi Okayama - Drums
Eiji Shimamura - Drums
Yūichi Togashiki - Drums
Tatsuo Hayashi - Drums
Nobu Saitō - Percussion
Yasukazu Satō - Percussion
Jun Sato - Keyboards
Hiroshi Shibui - Keyboards
Makiko Tashiro - Keyboards
Hidetoshi Yamada - Keyboards
Jake H. Conception - Saxophone
Shin Kazuhara - Trumpet
Eiji Arai - Trombone
Sumio Okada - Trombone
Yasuo Hirauchi - Trombone
Masao Suzuki - Clarinet
First Music - Strings
Isao Kaneyama - Marimba
Fumihiko Kazama - Midget Accordion
Keiji Azami - Dulcimer
Osamu Tozuka - Chorus
Hiroshi Narumi - Chorus

Production
Designer: Hirofumi Arai
Disk Promoter: Yoshiki Ishikawa
Recording Director: Yoshio Okujima
Recording & Mixing Engineer: Yoshihiko Kaminari, Koji Sakakibara, Shoya Mizutani
Manager: Hiroshi Kojima
Assistant Promotion Manager: Kunio Kaneko
Disk Co-ordinator: Yuzo Watanabe
Costume Designer: Mihoko Kiyokawa
Art Director: Jin Tamura
Remixing & Mastering Engineer: Kinji Yoshino
General Producer: Genichi Kawakami
Special Thanks to Sailor Shinohara

Chart positions

References

Miyuki Nakajima albums
1979 albums
Pony Canyon albums
Self-covers albums